The 1974 Miami Hurricanes baseball team represented the University of Miami in the 1974 NCAA Division I baseball season. The Hurricanes played their home games at the original Mark Light Field. The team was coached by Ron Fraser in his 12th season at Miami.

The Hurricanes lost the College World Series, defeated by the USC Trojans in the championship game.

Roster

Schedule and results

! style="" | Regular Season (44–8)
|- valign="top"

|- align="center" bgcolor="#ccffcc"
| ||  || Mark Light Field • Coral Gables, Florida || 3–2 || 1–0
|- align="center" bgcolor="#ccffcc"
| || Jacksonville || Mark Light Field • Coral Gables, Florida || 9–8 || 2–0
|- align="center" bgcolor="#ccffcc"
| ||  || Mark Light Field • Coral Gables, Florida || 12–0 || 3–0
|-

|- align="center" bgcolor="#ccffcc"
| ||  || Mark Light Field • Coral Gables, Florida || 4–3 || 4–0
|- align="center" bgcolor="#ffcccc"
| || Florida || Mark Light Field • Coral Gables, Florida || 6–9 || 4–1
|- align="center" bgcolor="#ccffcc"
| ||  || Mark Light Field • Coral Gables, Florida || 3–0 || 5–1
|- align="center" bgcolor="#ffcccc"
| || Florida Tech || Mark Light Field • Coral Gables, Florida || 1–7 || 5–2
|- align="center" bgcolor="#ccffcc"
| ||  || Mark Light Field • Coral Gables, Florida || 9–2 || 6–2
|- align="center" bgcolor="#ccffcc"
| || Saint Joseph's || Mark Light Field • Coral Gables, Florida || 5–2 || 7–2
|- align="center" bgcolor="#ffcccc"
| || at  || Henley Field • Lakeland, Florida || 0–1 || 7–3
|- align="center" bgcolor="#ccffcc"
| || at Florida Southern || Henley Field • Lakeland, Florida || 3–2 || 8–3
|- align="center" bgcolor="#ccffcc"
| ||  || Mark Light Field • Coral Gables, Florida || 7–4 || 9–3
|- align="center" bgcolor="#ccffcc"
| || Indiana || Mark Light Field • Coral Gables, Florida || 4–2 || 10–3
|- align="center" bgcolor="#ccffcc"
| || Indiana || Mark Light Field • Coral Gables, Florida || 7–6 || 11–3
|- align="center" bgcolor="#ccffcc"
| ||  || Mark Light Field • Coral Gables, Florida || 9–3 || 12–3
|- align="center" bgcolor="#ccffcc"
| || Memphis || Mark Light Field • Coral Gables, Florida || 5–2 || 13–3
|- align="center" bgcolor="#ccffcc"
| ||  || Mark Light Field • Coral Gables, Florida || 3–2 || 14–3
|- align="center" bgcolor="#ccffcc"
| || Florida State || Mark Light Field • Coral Gables, Florida || 4–3 || 15–3
|- align="center" bgcolor="#ccffcc"
| || Seton Hall || Mark Light Field • Coral Gables, Florida || 4–3 || 16–3
|- align="center" bgcolor="#ccffcc"
| ||  || Mark Light Field • Coral Gables, Florida || 16–1 || 17–3
|- align="center" bgcolor="#ccffcc"
| ||  || Mark Light Field • Coral Gables, Florida || 5–2 || 18–3
|- align="center" bgcolor="#ccffcc"
| || Seton Hall || Mark Light Field • Coral Gables, Florida || 6–2 || 19–3
|- align="center" bgcolor="#ccffcc"
| || Buffalo || Mark Light Field • Coral Gables, Florida || 16–1 || 20–3
|- align="center" bgcolor="#ccffcc"
| || Ohio State || Mark Light Field • Coral Gables, Florida || 5–0 || 21–3
|- align="center" bgcolor="#ccffcc"
| ||  || Mark Light Field • Coral Gables, Florida || 4–1 || 22–3
|- align="center" bgcolor="#ccffcc"
| ||  || Mark Light Field • Coral Gables, Florida || 12–3 || 23–3
|- align="center" bgcolor="#ccffcc"
| ||  || Mark Light Field • Coral Gables, Florida || 6–1 || 24–3
|- align="center" bgcolor="#ccffcc"
| || Michigan State || Mark Light Field • Coral Gables, Florida || 10–3 || 25–3
|- align="center" bgcolor="#ccffcc"
| || Montclair State || Mark Light Field • Coral Gables, Florida || 12–3 || 26–3
|- align="center" bgcolor="#ccffcc"
| || Southern Illinois || Mark Light Field • Coral Gables, Florida || 6–1 || 27–3
|- align="center" bgcolor="#ccffcc"
| || Michigan State || Mark Light Field • Coral Gables, Florida || 13–3 || 28–3
|-

|- align="center" bgcolor="#ccffcc"
| ||  || Mark Light Field • Coral Gables, Florida || 9–4 || 29–3
|- align="center" bgcolor="#ccffcc"
| || FIU || Mark Light Field • Coral Gables, Florida || 5–1 || 30–3
|- align="center" bgcolor="#ccffcc"
| || at  || Perry Field • Gainesville, Florida || 4–0 || 31–3
|- align="center" bgcolor="#ccffcc"
| || at Florida || Perry Field • Gainesville, Florida || 6–5 || 32–3
|- align="center" bgcolor="#ccffcc"
| ||  || Mark Light Field • Coral Gables, Florida || 9–6 || 33–3
|- align="center" bgcolor="#ffcccc"
| || Rollins || Mark Light Field • Coral Gables, Florida || 4–8 || 33–4
|- align="center" bgcolor="#ffcccc"
| || at Florida State || Seminole Field • Tallahassee, Florida || 1–2 || 33–5
|- align="center" bgcolor="#ffcccc"
| || at Florida State || Seminole Field • Tallahassee, Florida || 4–7 || 33–6
|- align="center" bgcolor="#ccffcc"
| || at Florida State || Seminole Field • Tallahassee, Florida || 17–3 || 34–6
|- align="center" bgcolor="#ccffcc"
| || at  || Unknown • Tallahassee, Florida || 4–2 || 35–6
|- align="center" bgcolor="#ffcccc"
| || at Florida A&M || Unknown • Tallahassee, Florida || 5–8 || 35–7
|- align="center" bgcolor="#ccffcc"
| || at FIU || Unknown • Miami, Florida || 6–2 || 36–7
|- align="center" bgcolor="#ccffcc"
| || Biscayne || Mark Light Field • Coral Gables, Florida || 13–5 || 37–7
|- align="center" bgcolor="#ccffcc"
| ||  || Mark Light Field • Coral Gables, Florida || 7–2 || 38–7
|- align="center" bgcolor="#ccffcc"
| || Tampa || Mark Light Field • Coral Gables, Florida || 11–1 || 39–7
|-

|- align="center" bgcolor="#ccffcc"
| || Biscayne || Mark Light Field • Coral Gables, Florida || 19–1 || 40–7
|- align="center" bgcolor="#ccffcc"
| ||  || Mark Light Field • Coral Gables, Florida || 20–2 || 41–7
|- align="center" bgcolor="#ccffcc"
| || South Florida || Mark Light Field • Coral Gables, Florida || 9–7 || 42–7
|- align="center" bgcolor="#ccffcc"
| || at Biscayne || Unknown • Miami, Florida || 18–1 || 43–7
|- align="center" bgcolor="#ffcccc"
| ||  || Mark Light Field • Coral Gables, Florida || 7–9 || 43–8
|- align="center" bgcolor="#ccffcc"
| || Stetson || Mark Light Field • Coral Gables, Florida || 4–3 || 44–8
|-

|-
! style="" | Postseason (7–3)
|-

|- align="center" bgcolor="#ccffcc"
| || vs  || Dudy Noble Field • Starkville, Mississippi || 2–1 || 45–8
|- align="center" bgcolor="#ccffcc"
| || vs  || Dudy Noble Field • Starkville, Mississippi || 7–1 || 46–8
|- align="center" bgcolor="#ccffcc"
| || vs  || Dudy Noble Field • Starkville, Mississippi || 5–0 || 47–8
|- align="center" bgcolor="#ffcccc"
| || vs South Carolina || Dudy Noble Field • Starkville, Mississippi || 1–3 || 47–9
|- align="center" bgcolor="#ccffcc"
| || vs South Carolina || Dudy Noble Field • Starkville, Mississippi || 2–1 || 48–9
|-

|- align="center" bgcolor="#ccffcc"
| || vs  || Johnny Rosenblatt Stadium • Omaha, Nebraska || 4–1 || 49–9
|- align="center" bgcolor="#ccffcc"
| || vs  || Johnny Rosenblatt Stadium • Omaha, Nebraska || 5–1 || 50–9
|- align="center" bgcolor="#ccffcc"
| || vs USC Trojans || Johnny Rosenblatt Stadium • Omaha, Nebraska || 7–3 || 51–9
|- align="center" bgcolor="#ffcccc"
| || vs Southern Illinois || Johnny Rosenblatt Stadium • Omaha, Nebraska || 3–4 || 51–10
|- align="center" bgcolor="#ffcccc"
| || vs USC || Johnny Rosenblatt Stadium • Omaha, Nebraska || 3–7 || 51–11
|- align="center" bgcolor="white"

| Schedule Source:

Awards and honors 
Orlando González
All Tournament Team

Manny Trujillo
All Tournament Team

Ron Scott
All Tournament Team

Stan Jakubowski
All Tournament Team

Hurricanes in the 1974 MLB Draft
The following members of the Miami Hurricanes baseball program were drafted in the 1974 Major League Baseball Draft.

References

Miami (FL)
Miami Hurricanes baseball seasons
Miami Hurricaness baseball
College World Series seasons